Panorpa germanica, also known by its common name German scorpionfly, is a species from the genus Panorpa.

References

Insects described in 1758
Panorpidae